Bruno Parma (born December 30, 1941) is a Slovene-Yugoslav chess player and Grandmaster.

Parma was born in Ljubljana, in Italian-occupied Slovenia. He first played in the World Junior Chess Championship in 1959, sharing second place.  Two years later at age 21 he won the next Junior Championship (The Hague 1961), receiving the title of International Master.
FIDE granted him the grandmaster title based on his outstanding performance at the Beverwijk tournament in 1963. He was the third Slovene to become a grandmaster, after Milan Vidmar (1950) and Vasja Pirc (1953). He won the Slovenian Chess Championship in 1959 and 1961 and shared third place with Dragoljub Minić, Milan Matulović, and Bojan Kurajica in the 1968 Yugoslav Championship in Čateške Toplice.

In an international tournament at San Juan, Puerto Rico in 1969 he was second together with two grandmasters, Arthur Bisguier and Walter Browne, behind Boris Spassky.  His best results was shared first with Georgi Tringov in Vršac 1973 ahead of Wolfgang Uhlmann.

Parma played for the Yugoslav team in the Chess Olympiads eight times: 1962, 1964, 1966, 1968, 1970, 1974, 1978, and 1980.  The Yugoslav team won four silver medals and two bronze medals in those years.

References

External links
 
 

1941 births
Living people
Sportspeople from Ljubljana
Chess grandmasters
Slovenian chess players
Yugoslav chess players
World Junior Chess Champions
Chess Olympiad competitors